Lieutenant General Charles Henri Belzile CM, CMM, CD (March 12, 1933 – December 5, 2016) was a Canadian army officer who served as head of the Canadian Army. He is an honorary member of the Royal Military College of Canada student #H22547.

Education
Born in Trois-Pistoles, Quebec, Belzile graduated from the Université de Montréal in 1953.

Military career
Belzile was commissioned in The Queen's Own Rifles of Canada in 1951. He was then assigned as a platoon commander in Korea. Upon his return from the Korean theatre, he assumed a number of staff and command positions including that of Adjutant with 2nd Battalion, Queen's Own Rifles of Canada and staff officer at Quebec Command Headquarters in Montreal.

In 1968 he was promoted lieutenant-colonel and appointed Commanding Officer, Royal 22e Régiment in Valcartier. In 1972, he was appointed Commander, Combat Arms School, at CFB Gagetown, New Brunswick as a colonel. He was later appointed to several high-profile positions in Canada and abroad. He commanded 4 Canadian Mechanized Brigade Group in the former Federal Republic of Germany as a brigadier-general. As  brigadier general he was Senior Canadian Officer at Headquarters, Central Army Group (CENTAG) in Hammonds Barracks, Seckenheim, Germany. As major-general in 1977 he took command of Canadian Forces Europe. In 1981 he was promoted lieutenant-general and appointed Commander, Mobile Command, the title under which the army was known at that time. He retired from active duty in 1986.

Later career
Following his retirement from the military, he held a position of Vice-President with SNC Industrial Technologies of Le Gardeur, Quebec, from 1987 to 1992. Since 1992 he has been President of CH Belzile Consultants. In 1994 he became part of a team on a study to improve the efficiency of the Irish Defence Forces. He served on the Special Commission on the Restructuring of the Canadian Forces Reserves. He was a member of the Special Advisory Group on Military Justice and Military Police Investigation Services. He was appointed Colonel Commandant of the Royal Canadian Army Cadets from 1993 to 1998. In 1998, he was appointed head of the Military Police Services Review Group. He has served as president of the Canadian Battle of Normandy Foundation (now the Canadian Battlefields Foundation), President of the Conference of Defence Associations and as a member of the Canadian War Museum Advisory Council. Belzile died on December 5, 2016 at the age of 83.

Honours
In 2000, he was made a Member of the Order of Canada.
 He was a recipient of the Vimy Award, which recognizes a Canadian who has made a significant and outstanding contribution to the defence and security of the nation and the preservation of our democratic values.

On 24 November 2001, he was appointed Honorary Grand President of The Royal Canadian Legion. He is a recipient of the French Légion d'Honneur.

References

1933 births
2016 deaths
Commanders of the Order of Military Merit (Canada)
Canadian generals
Members of the Order of Canada
Université de Montréal alumni
People from Trois-Pistoles, Quebec
Queen's Own Rifles of Canada officers
Royal Military College Saint-Jean alumni
United Nations military personnel
French Quebecers
Canadian Militia officers
Knights of the Order of St John
Recipients of the Legion of Honour
Canadian officials of the United Nations
Canadian military personnel of the Korean War
Commanders of the Canadian Army
Royal 22nd Regiment officers
Canadian military personnel from Quebec